Catharine Arnold is a British author, journalist and academic, best known for her 'London' series of five popular history books: Necropolis: London and Its Dead (2006), Bedlam: London and its mad (2008), City of Sin: London and its vices (2010), Underworld London: Crime and Punishment in the Capital City (2012), and Globe Life in Shakespeare's London (2015). Her most recent book is Pandemic 1918: The Story of the Deadliest Influenza in History written in 2018. Catharine Arnold read English at Girton College, Cambridge and holds a post-graduate degree in psychology. Catharine Arnold is UK Council for Psychotherapy and Counselling Writer in Residence 2020.

References

Living people
English journalists
English women non-fiction writers
Year of birth missing (living people)
English historians
British women historians